The name Gorio has been used for six tropical cyclones in the Philippines by PAGASA in the Western Pacific Ocean.

 Tropical Storm Trami (2001) (T0105, 07W, Gorio) 
 Typhoon Matsa (2005) (T0509, 09W, Gorio) – struck Ryukyu Islands and China.
 Tropical Storm Soudelor (2009) (T0905, 05W, Gorio) – struck southern China
 Tropical Storm Rumbia (2013) (T1306, 06W, Gorio) – struck the Philippines, China, Hong Kong, and Macau.
 Typhoon Nesat (2017) (T1709, 11W, Gorio) — struck Taiwan and East China.
 Tropical Storm Mirinae (2021) (T2110, 14W, Gorio) - formed east of Taiwan, and passed just south of Japan.

Pacific typhoon set index articles